James Foreman (21 December 1763 – 25 October 1854) was a Scottish immigrant to Canada who became an important force in the business community of Nova Scotia.

References 
 

Businesspeople from Nova Scotia
Scottish emigrants to pre-Confederation Nova Scotia
1763 births
1854 deaths